Rasmus Andersson (born 17 April 1993) is a Swedish footballer who last played for Tvååkers IF as a midfielder.

References

External links

 (archive)
Rasmus Andersson at Fotbolltransfers

1993 births
Living people
Swedish footballers
Swedish expatriate footballers
Association football midfielders
Allsvenskan players
Superettan players
Ettan Fotboll players
Falkenbergs FF players
FK Ørn-Horten players
Skála ÍF players
IS Halmia players
Swedish expatriate sportspeople in Norway
Expatriate footballers in Norway
Expatriate footballers in the Faroe Islands